Helicopis is a Neotropical genus of butterflies of the family Riodinidae.

List of species
 Helicopis gnidus (Fabricius, 1787
 Helicopis cupido (Linnaeus, 1758)
 Helicopis endymiaena (Hübner, [1819])

References
 Funet

Riodinidae
Riodinidae of South America
Butterfly genera
Taxa named by Johan Christian Fabricius